Jordan Murphy may refer to:

 Jordan Murphy (American actor), American actor, host and producer
 Jordan Murphy (basketball), American basketball player
 Jordan Murphy (English actor), British actor
 Jordan Murphy (footballer) (born 1996), English footballer